Lutske (Lutz) Jacobi (born December 13, 1955 in Katlijk) is a Dutch politician and former civil servant. As a member of the Labour Party (Partij van de Arbeid) she was an MP between November 30, 2006 and March 23, 2017. She focused on matters of natural environment, rural area, agriculture, horticulture, fishery, recreation and the Wadden Sea.

References

External links 

1955 births
Living people
Dutch civil servants
Labour Party (Netherlands) politicians
Members of the House of Representatives (Netherlands)
People from Heerenveen
21st-century Dutch politicians
21st-century Dutch women politicians